Wouter van der Steen (born 3 June 1990) is a Dutch professional footballer who plays as a goalkeeper for FC Den Bosch in the Dutch Eerste Divisie. He formerly played for Helmond Sport and SC Heerenveen.

Club career
Van der Steen did not extend his contract with Eredivisie side SC Heerenveen in summer 2018, he did not manage to become their first goalkeeper.

References

External links
 
 Career stats & Profile - Voetbal International

1990 births
Living people
People from Vught
Association football goalkeepers
Dutch footballers
Helmond Sport players
SC Heerenveen players
FC Den Bosch players
Eredivisie players
Eerste Divisie players